Rudolf Karl Lüneburg (30 March 1903, Volkersheim (Bockenem) - 19 August 1949, Great Falls, Montana), after his emigration at first Lueneburg, later Luneburg, falsified Luneberg) was a professor of mathematics and optics at the Dartmouth College Eye Institute. He was born in Germany, received his doctorate at Göttingen, and emigrated to the United States in 1935.

His work included an analysis of the geometry of visual space as expected from physiology and the assumption that the angle of vergence provides a constant measure of distance. From these premises he concluded that near field visual space is hyperbolic.

Bibliography
  published in: 
 
 Reprint:

See also
Luneburg lens
Luneburg method

1903 births
1949 deaths
German emigrants to the United States
Geometers
Optical physicists
Dartmouth College faculty
20th-century German mathematicians